Duke of Híjar is a hereditary title in the Peerage of Spain, accompanied by the dignity of Grandee and granted in 1483 by Ferdinand II to Juan Fernández de Híjar, Lord of Híjar and later also Duke of Lécera and Aliaga.

Dukes of Híjar (1483)

Juan Fernandez de Híjar y Cabrera, 1st Duke of Híjar
 Luis Fernández de Híjar y Beaumont, 2nd Duke of Híjar
 Juan Francisco Fernández de Hijar, 3rd Duke of Híjar
 Isabel Margarita Fernández de Híjar y Castro-Pinós, 4th Duchess of Híjar	
 Jaime Francisco Sarmiento de Silva, 5th Duke of Híjar	
 Juana Petronila de Silva y Aragón, 6th Duchess of Híjar	
 Isidro Francisco Fernández de Híjar y Silva, 7th Duke of Híjar	
 Joaquín Diego de Silva y Moncada, 8th Duke of Híjar	
 Pedro de Alcántara Fernández de Híjar y Abarca de Bolea, 9th Duke of Híjar	
 Agustín Pedro de Silva y Palafox, 10th Duke of Híjar
 Francisca Javiera de Silva y Fitz-James Stuart, 11th Duchess of Híjar	
 José Rafael de Silva Fernández de Híjar y Palafox, 12th Duke of Híjar	
 Cayetano de Silva y Fernández de Córdoba, 13th Duke of Híjar
 Agustín de Silva y Bernuy, 14th Duke of Híjar
 Alfonso de Silva y Campbell, 15th Duke of Híjar
 Alfonso de Silva y Fernández de Córdoba, 16th Duke of Híjar
 Cayetana Fitz-James Stuart y Silva, 17th Duchess of Híjar
 Alfonso Martínez de Irujo y Fitz-James Stuart, 18th Duke of Híjar

See also
List of dukes in the peerage of Spain
List of current Grandees of Spain

References 

Dukedoms of Spain
Grandees of Spain
Lists of dukes
Lists of Spanish nobility